Manesh Madhavan is an Indian cinematographer. He graduated from Film and Television Institute of India, Pune.

Career
He is an alumnus of Berlinale Talent
Campus at 58th Berlin International Film Festival 2008. A student of Polish Filmmaker Andrzej Wajda, Ellen Kuras ASC (At Berlinale 2008) and Santosh Sivan (at FTII Pune) and his credits includes feature films, documentaries, short films, advertisement films and music videos. He also worked as a Director of Photography for the Diploma Film of the famous University of California, Los Angeles (UCLA) the United States of America.
He won the Kerala State Film Award for Cinematographer in 2018 for the movie Aedan

Filmography

As cinematographer

As writer

References

Malayalam film cinematographers
Cinematographers from Kerala
People from Ernakulam district
Living people
Year of birth missing (living people)